Rodrigo de Castro Pereira (22 July 1887 – 1983) was a Portuguese tennis player. He was a one-time Portuguese national singles champion in 1931 and also a one-time doubles title-holder. He also won the CSIO Lisbon equestrian Grand Prix in 1945.

Early life and family
De Castro Pereira was born 22 July 1887 to Manuel de Castro Pereira, a Bachelor of Laws and Portuguese cavalry officer, and Cecilia van Zeller. His grandfather was Rodrigo Delfim Pereira, a Brazilian minister to Berlin, Paris, and Hamburg. His great-grandfather was Pedro I of Brazil, the ruler of Brazil and Portugal and the Algarves in the 1820s. His great-great-grandfather was John VI of Portugal, de facto King of United Kingdom of Portugal, Brazil and the Algarves and titular Emperor of Brazil.  Thus he spent his childhood in the royal court of Portugal. At the age of ten he began practising bullfighting. He graduated from the Academia Militar das Agulhas Negras as a civil engineer. At the age of 24 his second cousin once removed Manuel II of Portugal was forced to exile to the United States after the 5 October 1910 revolution; Royalist Rodrigo joined him pursued by the fear of being condemned for his affiliations.

Tennis career
In 1924 he competed in tennis at the 1924 Summer Olympics, where he was eliminated in the first round of both singles and doubles by Arturo Hortal and Enrique Maier and Ricardo Saprissa, to whom the Portuguese team gave a walkover. Next year in the 1925 French Championships he was defeated in the first round to Pierre Hirsch. In the follow up French Championships he succumbed to Bertie Meyer in five sets. The same year he lost in the Wimbledon first round as well.

In 1927 Pereira was invited into a national squad to represent Portugal in an international team challenge against the Spain Davis Cup team. Two years later he was part of the team who fought a rematch with Spain in Seville, where Arturo Suqué defeated Pereira in two sets. José de Verda and Castro Pereira lost to Enrique de Satrústegui Barrie and Pereira.

At the age of 44 in 1931 he won his first and only national championships trophy in singles.

In April 1933 in the Ernesto Bastos Cup of Laranjeiras he reached the finals, beating his own brother Nuno in the semis. In October he reached the doubles semifinals of the Tijuca tournament with José de Verda. As Portugal was absent from the Davis Cup between 1930 and 1948, in late October de Castro Pereira was drafted into an international team match in Santos, São Paulo, featuring the Brazil team as opponents. Pereira won the singles rubber against Gonçalves and also the doubles partnering Horta Costa against Gonçalves-Tsimonsen.

Sports diplomat career

In 1934 he was elected the president of the Portuguese Tennis Federation, an office he held twice, assuming it the second time in 1950. He was also the head figure of the Portuguese equestrian movement by first becoming the president of the Portuguese Equestrian Society in 1947 and, a decade later, of the Portuguese Equestrian Federation. He was also the member of the Portuguese Olympic Committee.

Personal life
After emigrating to the United States de Castro Pereira was a blue-collar worker at the Duquesne Works of the United States Steel Corporation for four years. With the help of his degree he was promoted to Superintendent. In the midst of World War I he first sought to be enlisted in the Portuguese Army, which was refused; then in 1917 he joined the American Expeditionary Forces and was transported to France. He earned the rank of a captain in the 1st Infantry Division. In 1920 he was appointed vice-president of Dorey Inc., a New York City-based export company. He moved back to Portugal in 1921 and in the 1930s he started working for Fassio Ltd., the Portuguese contractor of the American tractor manufacturer company Allis-Chalmers. In the meantime he kept on serving at the Portuguese Legion as a captain.

In 1966, he was awarded the Mohammed Taher Trophy by the International Olympic Committee. In 1978 he received the Golden Lion award from the Sporting Club de Portugal.

References

Ancestry

External links
 
 
 

1887 births
1983 deaths
Portuguese male tennis players
Portuguese male equestrians
Portuguese bullfighters
United States Army personnel of World War I
Rodrigo
Olympic tennis players of Portugal
Tennis players at the 1924 Summer Olympics
Date of death missing
Portuguese people of Brazilian descent
Presidents of the Portuguese Tennis Federation